Riccò may refer to:
 Annibale Riccò, an Italian astronomer
Riccardo Riccò an Italian cyclist
18462 Riccò an asteroid
Riccò del Golfo di Spezia,